Ucon is a city in Bonneville County, Idaho, United States. It is part of the Idaho Falls, Idaho Metropolitan Statistical Area. The population was 1,108 at the 2010 census. Ucon was first settled in 1883.

Geography
Ucon is located at  (43.593175, -111.959594).

Education
Ucon is served by the Bonneville Joint School District#93, with Ucon Elementary School within city limits. Students are bussed to Rocky Mountain Middle School, and Bonneville High School.

Demographics

2010 census
As of the census of 2010, there were 1,108 people, 336 households, and 277 families residing in the city. The racial makeup of the city was 95.9% White, 0.1% Asian, 0.3% Pacific Islander, 2.3% from other races, and 1.4% from two or more races. Hispanic or Latino of any race were 6.0% of the population.

There were 336 households, of which 50.3% had children under the age of 18 living with them, 67.3% were married couples living together, 11.6% had a female householder with no husband present, 3.6% had a male householder with no wife present, and 17.6% were non-families. 14.6% of all households were made up of individuals, and 6.6% had someone living alone who was 65 years of age or older. The average household size was 3.30 and the average family size was 3.69.

The median age in the city was 28.6 years. 38.1% of residents were under the age of 18; 7.6% were between the ages of 18 and 24; 25.2% were from 25 to 44; 19.6% were from 45 to 64; and 9.6% were 65 years of age or older. The gender makeup of the city was 53.1% male and 46.9% female.

2000 census
As of the census of 2000, there were 943 people, 280 households, and 236 families residing in the city. The racial makeup of the city was 95.33% White, 0.11% African American, 0.42% Native American, 2.44% from other races, and 1.70% from two or more races. Hispanic or Latino of any race were 4.14% of the population.

There were 280 households, out of which 43.9% had children under the age of 18 living with them, 74.6% were married couples living together, 7.9% had a female householder with no husband present, and 15.7% were non-families. 12.9% of all households were made up of individuals, and 4.3% had someone living alone who was 65 years of age or older. The average household size was 3.30 and the average family size was 3.62.

In the city, the population was spread out, with 34.7% under the age of 18, 9.4% from 18 to 24, 25.8% from 25 to 44, 22.4% from 45 to 64, and 7.7% who were 65 years of age or older. The median age was 32 years. For every 100 females, there were 111.4 males. For every 100 females age 18 and over, there were 102.0 males.

The median income for a household in the city was $39,375, and the median income for a family was $41,250. Males had a median income of $30,809 versus $19,911 for females. The per capita income for the city was $12,964. About 7.2% of families and 9.8% of the population were below the poverty line, including 14.6% of those under age 18 and 9.8% of those age 65 or over.

Notable people 

 N. M. Jorgensen, football coach
 Dean Mortimer, member of the Idaho Senate (raised in Ucon)
 Kristen Tracy, fiction writer and Emily Dickinson Prize winning poet (raised in Ucon)

References

Populated places established in 1883
Cities in Bonneville County, Idaho
Cities in Idaho
Cities in Idaho Falls metropolitan area